The Lokhandwala Foundation School is an English-medium school in Lokhandwala Township, Akurli Road, Kandivali, Mumbai, India. The school offers the ICSE board syl

labus for standard X students. The new school building has four floors, a basement, a terrace and a multipurpose basketball court, big auditorium accommodating 210+ students.

History
Lokhandwala Foundation Trust established the co-educational English medium Lokhandwala Foundation School in the year 1992. The School initially started with a small building in the Whispering Palms Housing CHS. Later, it was shifted to its new campus nearby, which has a four-floored building with a well structured playground. The new building also includes a large sized auditorium on the ground floor.

References

Schools in Mumbai